The 2008 FC Dallas season was the twelfth season of the Major League Soccer team. The team failed to make the postseason for the first time in four years.

Final standings

Regular season

U.S. Open Cup

External links
 Season statistics

FC Dallas seasons
FC Dallas
American soccer clubs 2008 season